ACEO may refer to:

 ACEO (brand), a brand name for the NSAID medication Acemetacin
 AC Electro-osmosis, a methodology for Optoelectrofluidics
 Art Cards, Editions and Originals, the Artist trading cards
 Association of Caribbean Electoral Organizations, a component of the International Foundation for Electoral Systems
 Advisory Committee for Earth Observation, a department of the European Space Agency's Mission Science Division
 Associação Comercial e Empresarial de Osasco, a leading company located in Osasco, São Paulo, Brazil

See also

 
 ace (disambiguation)
 CEO (disambiguation)